José Teodoro Bonfim Queiróz, known as Zé Teodoro (born 22 November 1963 in Anápolis), is a Brazilian football (soccer) manager.

Honors

Club honours 
  Goiás
 Campeonato Goiano: 1981, 1982, 1985

 São Paulo
 Campeonato Paulista: 1985, 1987, 1989, 1991
 Campeonato Brasileiro Série A: 1986, 1991

Titles as a manager 
 Náutico
 Campeonato Pernambucano: 2004

 Ceará
 Campeonato Cearense: 2006
    
 Fortaleza
 Campeonato Cearense: 2010

 Santa Cruz
 Campeonato Pernambucano: 2011, 2012

External links

1963 births
Living people
People from Anápolis
Brazilian footballers
Brazilian football managers
Association football defenders
Campeonato Brasileiro Série A players
Campeonato Brasileiro Série A managers
Campeonato Brasileiro Série B managers
Campeonato Brasileiro Série D managers
Anápolis Futebol Clube players
Goiás Esporte Clube players
São Paulo FC players
Guarani FC players
Fluminense FC players
Clube Atlético Bragantino players
Criciúma Esporte Clube players
Itumbiara Esporte Clube managers
Anápolis Futebol Clube managers
Goiânia Esporte Clube managers
Sociedade Esportiva do Gama managers
Esporte Clube Paraguaçuense managers
Rio Branco Esporte Clube managers
Esporte Clube Juventude managers
Paulista Futebol Clube managers
Esporte Clube Santo André managers
Clube Náutico Capibaribe managers
Associação Portuguesa de Desportos managers
Sport Club do Recife managers
Ceará Sporting Club managers
Avaí FC managers
Atlético Clube Goianiense managers
Fortaleza Esporte Clube managers
Santa Cruz Futebol Clube managers
Guarani FC managers
Vila Nova Futebol Clube managers
ABC Futebol Clube managers
Clube do Remo managers
Ríver Atlético Clube managers
Associação Atlética Aparecidense managers
Uberlândia Esporte Clube managers
Joinville Esporte Clube managers
Ferroviário Atlético Clube (CE) managers
Sportspeople from Goiás